Sevilla Fútbol Club "C" is the third team of Sevilla FC, a Spanish football team based in Seville, in the autonomous community of Andalusia. Founded in 2003, it plays in Tercera Federación, holding its official matches in the Ciudad Deportiva José Ramón Cisneros Palacios , with a capacity for 2,500 spectators. 

The team must play at least one division below Sevilla Atlético, who must themselves play one division lower than the main team Sevilla FC. Neither reserve team can enter the Copa del Rey.

Season to season

14 seasons in Tercera División
2 seasons in Tercera Federación

Current squad

Current technical staff

Selected former players

Selected former coaches
 Diego (2008-2009)
 Francisco (2009-2010)
 Diego Martínez (2010-2011)
 Fermín Galeote (2011–2013)
 Chesco Garramiola (2013–2015)
 Paco Peña (2016–2018)
 Lolo Rosano (2018-)

References

External links
Sevilla FC C official webpage 
La Preferente team profile 
Futbolme team profile 

Sevilla FC
Football clubs in Andalusia
Association football clubs established in 2003
Spanish reserve football teams
2003 establishments in Spain